John Lloyd Wharton  (18 April 1837 – 11 July 1912) was a Barrister and a Conservative Party politician. He was the Member of Parliament (MP) for Durham then MP for Ripon.

Early life
Wharton was born at Aberford in the West Riding of Yorkshire on 18 April 1837. He was the only son of John Thomas Wharton and Mary Jacob, daughter of Rev. John Henry Jacob. His uncle was William Lloyd Wharton, a barrister and chairman of the North Eastern Railway. In 1861, his uncle died and Wharton inherited his Windy Hill estate, which would become Wharton Park.

Wharton was educated at Eton College and Trinity College, Cambridge, where he received his B.A. in 1859. He was admitted to the Inner Temple on 14 April 1959 and was called to the bar on 27 January 1862. He later received an honorary D.C.L. from Durham University in 1887. From 1871 to 1906 he was chairman of the Durham Quarter Sessions.

Political career
He stood as a Member of Parliament for the City of Durham in the 1868 general election but failed to get elected. In May 1871 in a by-election caused by the death of the Member of Parliament John Robert Davison, Wharton, a Unionist candidate, beat the Liberal candidate with a majority of 34 to be elected as one of the Members of Parliament for City of Durham. He lost the seat to the Liberal candidate Thomas Charles Thompson in the 1874 general election. He stood again as a candidate in 1880 general election but failed to get elected.

He stood as a candidate for Ripon in the 1885 general election but failed to get elected when he lost by 165 votes to William Harker who was a strong local candidate. In 1886, he stood again for Ripon in the 1886 general election and was elected with a majority of 988. He was then the Member of Parliament for Ripon for 20 years until he was defeated at the 1906 general election by Henry Finnis Blosse Lynch with a majority of 313. He became a Privy Councillor in 1897 and in December 1901 he was appointed a Knight of Grace of the Order of St John.

In the 1911 Census of Wetherby he described himself as a 73-year-old widower and a Justice of the Peace for Yorkshire and Durham and a director of the North Eastern Railway.

Personal life
Wharton married Susan Frances Duncombe Shafto on 20 January 1870 but she died in 1872. The couple had a daughter Mary Dorothea in 1870. In 1894 she married Charles Waring Darwin; she had three sons including Charles John Wharton Darwin.

He served as the first president of the Durham Amateur Rowing Club, from 1860 to 1894.

Wharton died on 11 July 1912.

References

External links 
 

1837 births
1912 deaths
UK MPs 1886–1892
UK MPs 1892–1895
UK MPs 1895–1900
UK MPs 1900–1906
Conservative Party (UK) MPs for English constituencies
Knights of Grace of the Order of St John
Members of the Inner Temple
Alumni of Trinity College, Cambridge
Members of the Privy Council of the United Kingdom
North Eastern Railway (UK) people
Members of the Parliament of the United Kingdom for City of Durham
People educated at Eton College
English barristers